Alfred Richardson (1837?–1872) was a member of the Georgia Assembly in the U.S. State of Georgia, representing Clarke County. An African American, he entered government service after the U.S. Civil War during the Reconstruction era. Richardson faced hostility, intimidation, and physical attacks representing Clarke County. Richardson survived two shooting attacks by the Ku Klux Klan. In 1872 Richardson testified to a congressional committee that it was not safe for him to go home so he was staying in Athens, Georgia, and that many other "Colored" people had been forced to flee their farms in fear. He also spoke about being attacked and shot at at his house by men in disguise and said that he had been threatened, told of many instances of whippings, and that fellow "Colored" people were told that they should vote for Democrats or not vote at all.

Richardson and Madison Davis were elected to office for terms from 1868 to 1872. Richardson was forty years old and serving in the Georgia General Assembly in 1872 when he died of pneumonia.

Richardson was buried in the Gospel Pilgrim Cemetery in Athens, Georgia.

References

Further reading

1872 deaths
African-American state legislators in Georgia (U.S. state)
Politicians from Athens, Georgia
Deaths from pneumonia in Georgia (U.S. state)
Victims of the Ku Klux Klan
African-American politicians during the Reconstruction Era
1837 births
Original 33
19th-century American slaves

19th-century American politicians
Ku Klux Klan in Georgia (U.S. state)